Steven Dang (born July 21, 1997) is a Vietnamese–American soccer player who plays for Becamex Binh Duong.

Personal life
Dang was born in the United States but holds a Vietnamese passport through his parents.

Career statistics

Club

References

External links

1997 births
Living people
American soccer players
American sportspeople of Vietnamese descent
American people of Vietnamese descent
Association football defenders
Hoang Anh Gia Lai FC players
V.League 1 players